Road signs in Greece are regulated by the Ministry of Transport and the Hellenic Traffic Police, according to the Greek Highway Code.

Signs follow the general European conventions concerning the use of shape and colour, for every sign category. Signs indicating dangers are triangular with a red border, those giving orders are almost all circular (white on blue for mandatory instructions, black on white with a red border for prohibitions), and those providing information are rectangular. Most signs use pictograms to convey their particular meaning.

As is customary in European countries, all signs are partly or fully reflectorized or are provided with their own night-time illumination. Signs used for temporary regulations may have an orange background colour.

Greek road signs depict people with realistic (as opposed to stylized) silhouettes. All signs are identified by a Greek capital letter (for each category) and a number. Signs that indicate the same meaning but in a different direction have the same capital letter and number but are additionally differentiated by a lowercase letter (e.g. α, β, γ, δ, ... or α for left and δ for right).

History 

The history of road signaling in Greece dates back to Antiquity. The first road signaling included marble columns with the head of Hermes, protector of the wayfarers. Those signs were known as ἑρμαῖ ("Hermai"). There were also milestones for measuring street length in stadions.  Similar columns were also used in Roman times, but had miles as a unit of measurement.

The first road signage on Greek roads with contemporary signs was made in 1924 by ELPA (Elliniki Leschi Periigiseon kai Aftokinitou, lit. translated: Hellenic Club of Tours and Car), which took over the road network's signage until 1957, when it was taken over by the state.  The signs were subject to the provisions of the Geneva Protocol on Road Signs and Signals.

On July 25, 1962, and with Government Gazette A '110/62, it was announced in paragraph 1 of article 14 that "by joint decisions, issued by the Ministers of Transport, Public Works and Interior, all matters relating to the road signs, road markings, the type of signals, the characteristics of the road signage and the manner of its application shall be defined," while in paragraph 2 of the same article that "the provisions of the International Geneva Protocol on Road Signs and Signals of September 1949, with its supplements, are temporarily valid and up-to the apply of the referenced of the paragraph 1 of this article."

Finally, on July 6, 1974, 12 years after the initial announcements and with the Government Gazette B '676/74, the first serious signaling standards were established, which are still valid today. It was the first time that sign diagrams were included in a Government Gazette. Since the publication of the relevant Government Gazette, the "provisions of paragraph 2 of article 14 of Law 4332/62 "on the ratification of the Road Traffic Code" have been abolished. However, within five years of its publication, six of the old signs from the Geneva Protocol were still valid, as "temporarily preserved signs."

The ΠΤΠ (Πρότυπες Τεχνικές Προδιαγραφές – Standard Technical Specifications) Σ301-75, and Σ301-302-75 (ΦΕΚ 99 B '/ 1976) established the quality of the aluminum of the sign, the ΠΤΠ of ΦΕΚ 1061 B' / 1980, as corrected by the order BM5 / 0/40229 / 27-10-1980 the support poles, the ΠΤΠ of the ΦΕΚ 589 / Β / 1980 the signalling of performed intercity road works, the ΠΤΠ of the ΦΕΚ 121 / Β / 1983 the signalling of performed city road works, the ΠΤΠ Σ310 and Σ311 the membranes of the signs, the technical specification ΔΚ8 of ΕΗ3 / 0/107 / 22-1-1976 the poles for eccentric plates and the Greek standard ΕΛΟΤ- 743/87 the conversion of the Greek alphabet into Latin characters for the information signs, the Technical Description Δ3γ / 0/15/11-Ω / 28-2-1991 the illuminated signs, the Directive of ΔΜΕΟε / οικ / 720 / 13-11-92 the issues of road signs that are not covered by the previous specifications, the Community Directives and the corresponding Circulars of the Ministry TEM and the KME and ΤΣΥ the signaling and the types of safety equipment on the motorways and the relevant legislation of the Highway Code for advertisement signs. At the same time, in 1976 and 1981, the Katharevousa and the Polytonic System, respectively, were abolished and replaced by new dialects and writing systems (Dimotiki and Monotonic). The Road Design Studies Instructions (OMOE) for the Motorway Signs and Signals (ΚΣΑ) and for the Marking of Performed Works (ΣΕΕΟ), concern the signs for these issues. (ΦΕΚ 905/2011 / B ') Finally, many recent laws (mainly laws of the Highway Code), have introduced new signs of various categories, which mainly concern vehicles that appear for the first time (e.g. trams or electric cars).

Design

Font 
The font on the signs since 1974 is Transport, which also appears on the signs of other European countries. On motorways, the DIN 1451 font is used.

Language 
The signs in Greece are in two languages: Greek (Greek Alphabet) and English (Latin Alphabet). Previously, the signs were in Katharevousa and used the Polytonic system, until 1976 and 1981, which were replaced by the Demotic and Monotonic systems respectively.

Retroreflection 
Signs during the night are either:

 Internally illuminated – that is, of suitable translucent materials, illuminated by internal illumination systems. The application of these signs is restricted mainly to urban areas and to specific high-risk interurban networks.
 Externally illuminated – that is, they are illuminated by lamps facing them. These signs are applied at places where the light beam of cars is difficult to reach, such as the road sign gantries.
 With reflective materials – that is, part or all of which is of a suitable reflective film. They may not be reflective (at roads that are lit at night), semi-reflective (only symbols are reflective) or fully reflective (except symbols).

Finally, there are fluorescent reflective membranes, used in special circumstances, as a backdrop for school signs or signs indicating significant hazards.

Material 
According to ΦΕΚ 99/76 B, the plates are made of aluminum sheets, "of alloy type AIMg 2 according to DIN 1725 Blatt I" or aluminum "type SIC 114 according to BS 873: PART 1: 1970 > 3 mm." To prevent corrosion, "they are calculated with a safety factor in terms of their mechanical strength, above 1.61."

Poles 
According to ΦΕΚ 1061 B '/ 1980, the poles of the signs are metal and are made of steel pipes or pipes made of aluminum alloy. The poles are usually made of steel, in the form of hollow beams, or of lightly reinforced concrete in circular sections. Two or more poles can also be used on larger signs.

Dimensions 
The signs have the following sizes:

They are found mainly in villages, small towns, private and rural roads, as well as in private areas. They are rarely placed on provincial roads, and if approved by the Competent Service.
They are found mainly in large cities and on provincial and / or national roads.
They are found mainly on expressways.

On motorways, the size of the sign and the letters, as well as the font, require special treatment due to the different driving requirements on these roads.

Categorization

Warning signs (ΚΟΚ series Κ) 

The Κ series of ΚΟΚ, includes warning signs. These signs have mostly a triangular shape (except for Κ-33 to Κ-37 and Κ-42α). Their borders are red (except for Κ-42α which is black) and their background is yellow (except for Κ-21 and Κ-42α which their white) with the pictograms being black. These signs are intended to alert drivers early on of risks (e.g. dangerous places, accesses of road junctions, access of railway level crossings, etc.) in order to take the appropriate measures in time (e.g. reduction of speed). 

Source:

Regulatory signs (ΚΟΚ series Ρ) 

The Ρ series of ΚΟΚ, includes prohibitive and mandatory signs. These signs have mostly a round shape (except for Ρ-1 to Ρ-4, Ρ-6, Ρ-43, Ρ-44, Ρ-60, Ρ-61, Ρ-69 to Ρ-75). Prohibitive signs have their borders red and their background white with the pictograms being black. For mandatory signs, their background is blue and the pictograms is white. These signs are affixed to inform drivers of obligations, restrictions or prohibitions.

Sources:

Information signs (ΚΟΚ series Π) 

The Π series of ΚΟΚ, includes information signs. These signs are affixed to inform drivers of different kind of informations.

Sources:

Additional signs (ΚΟΚ series Πρ) 

These signs are rectangular with a black border on a white background with a black pictogram and are always combined with other road signs. Additional signs are never used by themselves.

Sources:

Temporary signs 

Usually, these signs have an orange colour for main, then the actual sign is on the center spaced out a bit.

Sources:

Other signs 

(This section needs more information)
These signs are unofficial.

Obsolete signs

Retired signs 

Most of these signs are withdrawn or replaced with new diagrams of the same meaning, except for some which their entirely obsoleted.

Sources:

Athens bus service signs

References 

Hellenic Road Police
testkok.gr

Greece